Danai van Weerdenburg (born 1 August 1976) is a Dutch politician of the Party for Freedom, who was a member of the Senate from 2015 until 2017 and has been an MP since 2017.

References

1976 births
Living people
21st-century Dutch jurists
21st-century Dutch politicians
21st-century Dutch women politicians
Members of the House of Representatives (Netherlands)
Members of the Senate (Netherlands)
Party for Freedom politicians
People from Amstelveen
University of Amsterdam alumni